The 27th Rocket Artillery Brigade "Petro Kalnyshevsky" is an artillery formation of the Ukrainian Ground Forces, based in Sumy.

Current Structure 
As of 2017 the brigade's structure is as follows:

 27th Rocket Artillery Brigade "Petro Kalnyshevsky", Sumy
 Headquarters & Headquarters Battery
 1st Rocket Artillery Battalion (BM-27 Uragan)
 2nd Rocket Artillery Battalion (BM-27 Uragan)
 3rd Rocket Artillery Battalion (BM-27 Uragan)
 4th Rocket Artillery Battalion (BM-27 Uragan)
 Engineer Company
 Maintenance Company
 Logistic Company
 CBRN-defense Platoon

References

Artillery brigades of Ukraine